Airdrie F.C. may refer to the following Scottish association football clubs based in or around the town of Airdrie, North Lanarkshire:

Airdrie F.C., a defunct club that competed in the Scottish Cup between 1875 and 1890
Airdrie Bluebell F.C., a defunct club that competed in the Scottish Cup in 1880
Airdriehill F.C., a defunct club from Airdriehill that competed in the Scottish Cup between 1880 and 1890
Airdrieonians F.C. (1878), a defunct club, commonly known as Airdrie, that existed between 1878 and 2002
Airdrieonians F.C. (known as Airdrie United between 2002 and 2013), a successor club to the original Airdrieonians